Anderson Street is a New Jersey Transit rail station on the Pascack Valley Line. The station is one of two rail stations in Hackensack (the other being Essex Street) and located at Anderson Street near Linden Street.

The station house was built in 1869 (and opened on September 9, 1869) by the Hackensack and New York Railroad on a track extension from Passaic Street in Hackensack. The station was turned over to the Erie Railroad in 1896 and New Jersey Transit in 1983. The next year, the station was listed on the National Register of Historic Places. The station building, which was 139 years old, was destroyed in a three-alarm fire and explosion at 5:55 a.m. on January 10, 2009. At the time, the station house was the second-oldest (active service) in New Jersey (second to Ramsey's Main Street station). The station building was also the site for the Green Caboose Thrift Shop, a charity gift shop maintained by a branch of the Hackensack University Medical Center from 1962 until the station depot burned in 2009.

History

Hackensack and New York Railroad 

The original alignment of the Anderson Street station dates back to the chartering of the Hackensack and New York Railroad in 1856 by David P. Patterson and other investors. Their intent in creating the rail line was to help maintain a steam-powered train line in the Pascack Valley and have future ambitions to build the system northward. Although Hackensack was not a large hub, there were several rail lines serving the city, including the New Jersey Midland Line (now the New York, Susquehanna and Western Railroad) with stops at Main Street (at the Mercer Street intersection) and at Prospect Avenue. During the 1860s, service was extended to north, terminating at Essex Street. Residents from the Anderson Street area donated $2,600 (1869 USD) to have a new station depot constructed along new tracks heading northward. Although most Hackensack and New York trains ended at Passaic Street, service was extended northward on September 5, 1869, when that stop was abandoned in replacement for Anderson Street. Just next year, service was extended northward on the Hackensack and New York Railroad Extension Railroad to Cherry Hill (now North Hackensack / New Bridge Landing) and onto Hillsdale.

The Anderson Street Station had a wood siding with a shingled roof, two brick chimneys off the roof and two asphalt platforms in both directions. The station also had a garage door on the southern side of the building. No official style of architecture was mentioned for Anderson Street in the 1920 Final Engineering Report due to lack of design. Nearby, a wooden watchman's shanty was constructed near the team track. The station had two tracks run through it (one main track and a team track) and had a rail crossing between tracks. By 1870, the tracks had been extended northward to Hillsdale, and public service began on the line on March 4 of that year. Trains terminated at Hillsdale with fare of only $0.75 (1870 USD), but just one year later, the extension northward. The service was extended northward to the community of Haverstraw, New York, and in 1896, the rail line was leased by the private company to the Erie Railroad.

Erie Railroad station and restoration 
After the leasing of the New Jersey and New York Railroad to the Erie Railroad, the history of Anderson Street station remained rather quiet, with minor changes to the station building and site occurring over the next sixty years. The Erie had repainted the station to a common green and white Erie Railroad paint scheme. By 1964, there were new asphalt pavement platforms on both the northbound main track and the southbound team track, crossing gates had been installed and the paint scheme was fading to a darker green. By September 1966, the Erie Lackawanna (a merge of the Erie Railroad and Delaware, Lackawanna and Western) sold off the station building to become the site of the Green Caboose Thrift Shop,  and repainted a teal green color. The nearby watchman's shanty, closed on Sundays, were repainted to tan and green with a red roof. The team track was also being dismantled by this point. Later, in 1972, the station experienced minor changes, with the Green Caboose Thrift Shop remaining in service the station building being repainted by the Erie Lackawanna a dark green (with the Erie Lackawanna's red doors). The nearby watchman's shanty was not repainted, remaining the railroad's common red color and the team track had been long removed, with no remains were noticeable.

In 1976, the Erie Lackawanna was combined with several other railroads to create the Consolidated Rail Corporation, who continued maintenance of the New Jersey and New York Line for the next seven years, until the newly formed New Jersey Transit took over the station in 1983. On March 17, 1984, the station building, now 114 years old, was added to the New Jersey Register of Historic Places and by that June, the station was added to the National Register of Historic Places. The station building was restored in 2001 by contractors from Jablonski Building Conservation Incorporated in Midtown Manhattan, who had experience restoring train stations. The building conservation repainted the old station's wooden siding yellow and the bay windows to a brand new brown on the station's ground-level platform.

Station building fire and explosion 

At approximately 5:55 a.m. on January 10, 2009, the station building for Anderson Street caught fire and ruptured two propane tanks, which caused the building to explode. Two nearby cars were damaged as well. The three-alarm fire destroyed the building, and caused damage to a nearby apartment complex. Twelve fire companies were called to battle the blaze, including fire stations from Teaneck, Ridgefield Park, Bogota and South Hackensack. Service on the Pascack Valley Line had to be stopped indefinitely until they could demolish the unsafe site of the former station building and inspect the area to allow train usage. Hackensack city manager Stephen Lo Iacono was notified of the fire and deemed it a "devastating loss for the community." At 11 a.m., city officials were digging up the area around the station to stop the gas line near the new station. 

The Green Caboose Thrift Shop, a charity gift shop run by a ladies auxiliary of the Hackensack University Medical Center which was housed in the station, received a major blow after the explosion, which destroyed all their merchandise. The Green Caboose has since moved to Orchard Street in Hackensack. On February 7, 2011 an application was filed to remove the destroyed structure from both the New Jersey and National Registers of Historic Places, to prevent a person from constructing a new station that would not be considered "historic". On May 18, 2011, the station was removed from the National Register and its listing with the 51 other stations in the original 1984 package.

New train station
In March 2013, construction began on a new station. The cost of the new station was $571,061. The new building completed in 2014 has a waiting room with three walls and ticket machines.

Station layout

The Anderson Street station is located at the intersection with Anderson Street and Linden Avenue in Hackensack. The station has one track running through it, with one lone asphalt side platform appearing on the northbound side. The station has a nearby parking lot at the same intersection, with 50 parking spaces maintained by Park America (under lease from New Jersey Transit). Two of these 50 parking spaces are handicap accessible, although the station itself is not. These parking spots are permit-only, but are free to use on evenings and weekends. Tickets may be purchased at the station. There is nearby access to the 175 and 770 New Jersey Transit bus lines.

See also 

 Operating Passenger Railroad Stations Thematic Resource (New Jersey)
 National Register of Historic Places listings in Bergen County, New Jersey

References

1869 establishments in New Jersey
Railway stations in Bergen County, New Jersey
Former National Register of Historic Places in New Jersey
Hackensack, New Jersey
NJ Transit Rail Operations stations
Railway stations in the United States opened in 1869
Former Erie Railroad stations
Demolished railway stations in the United States